Gerardus is a Latinized version of the Germanic name Gerard. It has been in use as a birth name in the Low Countries. In daily life, most people use a shorter version, such as Geert, Ger, Gerard, Gerd, Gerhard, Gerrie, Gerrit, Gert,  and Geurt. Among people with this name are:

Latinized names
Gerardus de Abbatisvilla (1220–1272), French theologian
Gerardus Bruxellensis, 13th-century Belgian geometer and philosopher
Gerardus Cameracensis (c.975–1051), Belgian bishop of Cambrai 
Gerardus Cremonensis (c.1114–1187), Italian translator of scientific books
Gerardus Mercator (1512–1594), Netherlandish cartographer, geographer and cosmographer
Gerardus Odonis (1285–1349), French theologian and Minister General of the Franciscan Order
Gerardus Rivius (fl. 1592–1625), Flemish printer
Gerardus Rufus Vacariensis (1500–1550), French Catholic theologian and humanist
Gerardus a Schagen (c.1642–1724), Dutch engraver and cartographer
Gerardus Vossius (1577–1649), Dutch classical scholar and theologian
Gerardus de Zutphania (1367–1398), Dutch mystical writer
Birth names
Gerardus Pieter Baerends (1916–1999), Dutch zoologist and ethologist
Gerardus Beekman (1653–1723), New Netherland physician, land owner, and colonial governor of New York
Gerardus Johannes Berenschot (1887–1941), Commander-in-Chief of the Royal Netherlands East Indies Army
Gerardus Leonardus Blasius (1627–1682), Dutch physician and anatomist 
Gerardus J.P.J. Bolland  (1854–1922), Dutch  linguist, philosopher, biblical scholar, and lecturer
Gerardus Petrus Booms (1822–1897), Dutch lieutenant-general, Minister of War, and publisher
Gerardus Brackx (1931–2011), Belgian travel businessman
Gerardus J.M. Braks (born 1933),  Dutch government minister and President of the Senate
Gerardus H.G. von Brucken Fock (1859–1935), Dutch pianist and composer
Gerardus Meinardus Bruggink (1917–2005), Dutch Air Force pilot during World War II
Gerardus Clark (1786–1860), American lawyer
Gerardus Antonius Cox (born 1940), Dutch singer, cabaret artist and actor
Gerardus Croese (1642–1710), Dutch Reformed minister and author
Gerardus Johannes Geers (1891–1965), Dutch linguist and Hispanist
Gerardus Gul (1847–1920), Dutch Archbishop
Gerardus Philippus Helders (1905–2013), Dutch politician, Minister of Colonial Affairs
Gerardus Heymans (1857–1930), Dutch philosopher and psychologist
Gerardus 't Hooft (born 1946), Dutch theoretical physicist and Nobel Laureate
Gerardus Huysmans (1902–1948), Dutch government minister
Gerardus Kamper (born 1950), Dutch cyclist
Gerardus Johannes Lap (1951–2017), Dutch ceramist
Gerardus B.M. Leers (born 1951), Dutch government minister and mayor
Gerardus van der Leeuw (1890–1950), Dutch historian and philosopher of religion
Gerardus Mes (fl. 1560), Flemish composer
Gerardus Mühren (1946–2013), Dutch footballer
Gerardus Johannes Mulder (1802–1880), Dutch organic and analytical chemist
Gerardus Rubens (1674–1736), Flemish Cistercian abbot
Gerardus Cornelius Schoffelen (born 1937), Dutch sculptor
Gerardus Siderius (1914–1990), Dutch canoeist
Gerardus J. Sizoo (1900–1994), Dutch physicist
Gerardus van Swieten (1700–1772), Dutch-Austrian physician
Gerardus Franciscus Tebroke (1949–1995), Dutch long-distance runner
Gerardus B.M.C. Thoolen (1943–1996), Dutch stage and film actor
Gerardus M.J. Veldkamp (1921–1990), Dutch economists and government minister
Gerardus Petrus Voorting (1923–2015), Dutch road cyclist
Gerardus de Vries Lentsch (1883–1973), Dutch competitive sailor
Gerardus Maria Willems (born 1946), Dutch-born Australian classical pianist
Gerardus Wynkoop II (died 1812), Pennsylvania politician
Gerardus Josephus Xavery (1700–aft.1747),  Flemish-Dutch etcher and painter

See also
Gerhardus

Dutch masculine given names
Latin masculine given names